Nino Bibbia (15 March 1922 – 28 May 2013) was an Italian skeleton racer and bobsledder who competed in the late 1940s. Born in Bianzone, Lombardy, he won the gold medal in the men's skeleton event at the 1948 Winter Olympics in St. Moritz.

He was Italy's first Winter Olympic medalist in any sport, its first gold medalist in the Winter Games, and its first in bobsleigh, luge, and skeleton.

Biography
Bibbia also competed in bobsleigh at those same games, finishing sixth in the four-man and eighth in the two-man event respectively. Bibbia was also involved in other winter sports, including ski jumping, cross-country skiing, and alpine skiing. All told, he earned 231 golds, 97 silvers, and 84 bronzes in his illustrious career.

Turn 10 at Cesana Pariol, where the bobsleigh, luge, and skeleton competitions at the 2006 Winter Olympics took place, is named in Bibbia's honor.

Bibbia spent the last years of his life in Engadin, where he died at the age of 91 on 28 May 2013.

References

Notes
 Men's skeleton Olympic medalists since 1928
 Wallechinsky, David (1984). The Complete Book of the Olympics: 1896 - 1980. New York: Penguin Books. pp. 558, 560, 577.

External links
 
 
 

1922 births
2013 deaths
Sportspeople from the Province of Sondrio
Italian male bobsledders
Italian male skeleton racers
Olympic bobsledders of Italy
Olympic skeleton racers of Italy
Olympic gold medalists for Italy
Bobsledders at the 1948 Winter Olympics
Skeleton racers at the 1948 Winter Olympics
Olympic medalists in skeleton
Medalists at the 1948 Winter Olympics